Singen (Hohentwiel) station is an important regional railway junction and interchange station in the town of Singen in the south of the German state of Baden-Württemberg. Three railways now meet there, but in the past five railways connected to it. The station is served by InterCity trains on the Stuttgart–Zurich route.

Name
Deutsche Bahn officially call the station Singen (Hohentwiel). Because of its size and its significance for the district of Konstanz, the station is sometimes referred to as  Singen Hauptbahnhof  locally. In addition, the abbreviations Singen (Hohentw), Singen (Htw) and just Singen are used.

Railway lines
Singen is near the starting point of the Immendingen–Horb and Horb–Stuttgart line (Gäu Railway, Gäubahn) to Stuttgart. On this line, the city is a stop for InterCity services between Stuttgart, Singen, Schaffhausen and Zurich. In addition, trains on the Black Forest Railway (Badische Schwarzwaldbahn), connecting Singen Offenburg and Konstanz stop in Singen. The High Rhine Railway (Hochrheinbahn) provides connections to Waldshut and Basel.

History
Singen owes its development from a farming village into industrial town primarily to its role as a railway junction. The railway reached the village for the first time in 1863, when the Upper Rhine Railway was completed from Basel to Konstanz (Constance). Ten years later, the Black Forest Railway was completed from Offenburg to Konstanz, connecting with the Upper Rhine Railway in Singen. The Etzwilen–Singen railway to Switzerland completed the main lines connecting with Singen.

Large Swiss companies established their German branch factories in Singen, not least because of its good rail connection. The factory workers were now brought to work in Singen in great numbers by train. A local commuter railway, the Randen Railway (Randenbahn), was built in 1912, but it was closed in 1966.

The railway used to be one of the largest employers in Singen. The first station building was soon replaced by a more solid building, which still stands today with small changes. The goods yard, which formerly stood on the other side of the tracks with sidings connecting directly from the factories, soon became too small. Therefore, a new freight yard was built in 1927.

The section of the High Rhine Railway between Schaffhausen and Singen was electrified in 1989.

ICE trainsets 403 015 and 403 515 (ICE 3, class 403) were given the name of Singen (Hohentwiel) in Singen station on 7 June 2008.

Platforms

Customs
Singen is, for customs purposes, a border station for passengers arriving from Switzerland using direct services without intermediate stops. Customs checks may be performed in the station or on board trains by German officials. Systematic passport controls were abolished when Switzerland joined the Schengen Area in 2008.

Operations

Singen (Hohentwiel) has been part of the Verkehrsverbund Hegau-Bodensee (Hegau-Bodensee Transport Association, VHB) since its inception in 1996.

Long-distance services

Singen station is served by Intercity services at hourly intervals from Stuttgart via Singen and Schaffhausen to Zürich. Every two hours, it is served by Swiss Federal Railways (SBB) services hauled by Taurus locomotives of the Österreichische Bundesbahnen (ÖBB). In the other hour, it is served by Deutsche Bahn InterCity 2 services. From this there is a connection in Singen to an IC to Zurich, which also runs with SBB cars. Individual IC 2 services run from Singen to Konstanz instead of Zürich.

Furthermore, on weekends two pairs of Inter City services, operating as the Bodensee (Lake Constance), connect Konstanz with Dortmund and Emden.

A pair of IC services called Schwarzwald ("Black Forest") was operated from Hamburg to Konstanz, replacing one of the hourly cycle of regional services, until its discontinuation in December 2014 and it was then replaced by another regional train between Offenburg and Konstanz.

Regional services

In regional transport, Interregio-Express and Regional-Express services stop in Singen, giving through connections to Karlsruhe, Stuttgart, Basel, Konstanz and Ulm via Friedrichshafen.

A Regionalbahn service connects Singen with Schaffhausen. A connecting service runs from Schaffhausen to Jestetten.

The Seehas (named after a mythical "lake hare"), an S-Bahn-like transport service, connects Singen to, among other places, Engen as well as Radolfzell, Konstanz and other municipalities on Lake Constance.

(as of 2022)

Defunct railway lines
Formerly the Randen Railway ran from Singen to Beuren Büßlingen. Similarly, the Etzwilen–Singen railway (Etzwilerbahn) ran via Rielasingen to Etzwilen in Switzerland .

Freight traffic
Freight is handled at a container terminal in the industrial area, which provides connections to Italy.

References

External links

 

Railway stations in Germany opened in 1863
Buildings and structures in Konstanz (district)
Railway stations in Baden-Württemberg
19th-century establishments in Württemberg